This is a list of current and historical currency of Germany. The sole currency of Germany has been the Euro since 2002.

List